Gladky Mys is a rural locality (a village) in Toykinskoye Rural Settlement, Bolshesosnovsky District, Perm Krai, Russia. The population was 14 as of 2010. There are 2 streets.

Geography 
Gladky Mys is located on the Chyornaya River, 27 km southwest of Bolshaya Sosnova (the district's administrative centre) by road. Kuzino is the nearest rural locality.

References 

Rural localities in Bolshesosnovsky District